Denis Lyle Rathbone (30 May 1912 – 1991) was an English track and field athlete who competed in the 1934 British Empire Games.

At the 1934 Empire Games he was a member of the English relay team which won the gold medal in the 4×440 yards event. In the 220 yards competition he was eliminated in the semi-finals.

External links
commonwealthgames.com results
Profile of Denis Rathbone

1912 births
1991 deaths
British male sprinters
English male sprinters
Athletes (track and field) at the 1934 British Empire Games
Commonwealth Games gold medallists for England
Commonwealth Games medallists in athletics
20th-century English people
Medallists at the 1934 British Empire Games